Sam Welsford (born 19 January 1996) is an Australian professional racing cyclist.  Welsford qualified for the Tokyo 2020 Olympics and was part of the Men's team pursuit together with Kelland O'Brien, Leigh Howard and Alexander Porter. They secured a bronze medal after overlapping New Zealand who had crashed. Welsford also competed in the Men's Madison where the team finished fifth with a time of 3:48.448 and therefore did not qualify for the final.

Biography 
Welsford's father was a keen cyclist, and Sam began joining him on rides when he was seven. Welsford worked hard at his cycling and won team pursuit junior world titles in 2013 and 2014.

After spending much of his career as a track specialist with occasional forays onto the road, Welsford signed with UCI WorldTeam   in November 2021, for two years. He rode in the men's team pursuit at the 2016 UCI Track Cycling World Championships winning a gold medal. Welsford won the 2019 UCI Men's elite Scratch race world championships less than an hour after breaking the Men's team pursuit World Record in a time of 3 minutes 48.012 seconds.

Major results

Road

2011
 2nd Time trial, National Novice Championships
2014
 1st Stage 1 Goldfields Classic
2016
 2nd National Under-23 Criterium Championships
2017
 1st Overall Tour of Gippsland
1st Stages 1, 2 & 3
 2nd Melbourne to Warrnambool Classic
2018
 1st Noosa International Criterium
 2nd Oita Ikoinomichi Criterium
 3rd National Under-23 Criterium Championships
 3rd Overall Tour of the King Valley
1st Stage 2
 4th Overall Tour of the Great South Coast
1st Stage 3
2019 
 1st Wal Smith Memorial - Casterton 50
 1st Stage 1 Tour of the Riverland
 3rd Overall Tour of the Great South Coast
1st Stages 1 & 3
2020
 1st  National Criterium Championships
 1st  Overall Bay Classic Series
1st Stage 1
2022
 1st Stage 5 Tour of Turkey
 3rd Scheldeprijs
 4th Bredene Koksijde Classic
2023
 Vuelta a San Juan
1st Stages 6 & 7
 1st Grand Prix Criquielion 
 3rd Bredene Koksijde Classic

Track

2013
 UCI World Junior Championships
1st  Team pursuit
1st  Omnium
3rd  Madison (with Joshua Harrison)
2014
 UCI World Junior Championships
1st  Team pursuit
2nd  Omnium
 Oceania Championships
1st  Team pursuit
1st  Madison
 National Championships
2nd Team pursuit
2nd Madison
3rd Individual pursuit
3rd Scratch
2015
 2nd  Scratch, Oceania Championships
 National Championships
2nd Points race
2nd Scratch
2nd Omnium
2016
 1st  Team pursuit, UCI World Championships
 1st  Individual pursuit, National Championships
 2nd  Team pursuit, Olympic Games
2017
 1st  Team pursuit, UCI World Championships
 Oceania Championships
1st  Team pursuit
1st  Points race
3rd  Omnium
 National Championships
1st  Madison
1st  Team pursuit
1st  Scratch
2018
 Commonwealth Games
1st  Scratch
1st  Team pursuit
 National Championships
1st  Individual pursuit
2nd Team sprint
 UCI World Cup
1st Omnium, Berlin
1st Team pursuit, Berlin
2019
 UCI World Championships
1st  Scratch
1st  Team pursuit
 Oceania Championships
1st  Omnium
1st  Scratch
 National Championships
2nd Madison
3rd Team pursuit
 UCI World Cup
2nd Madison (with Kelland O'Brien), Hong Kong
3rd Madison (with Leigh Howard), Glasgow
 2nd Six Days of Melbourne (with Cameron Scott)
 3rd Six Days of Brisbane (with Cameron Scott)
2020
 Oceania Championships
1st  Omnium
1st  Madison (with Kelland O'Brien)
2021
 3rd  Team pursuit, Olympic Games

References

External links

1996 births
Living people
Australian male cyclists
Cyclists from Perth, Western Australia
Cyclists at the 2016 Summer Olympics
Cyclists at the 2020 Summer Olympics
Olympic cyclists of Australia
Medalists at the 2016 Summer Olympics
Medalists at the 2020 Summer Olympics
Olympic silver medalists for Australia
Olympic bronze medalists for Australia
Olympic medalists in cycling
UCI Track Cycling World Champions (men)
Cyclists at the 2018 Commonwealth Games
Commonwealth Games medallists in cycling
Commonwealth Games gold medallists for Australia
Australian track cyclists
Medallists at the 2018 Commonwealth Games